The Ocean Way Sessions is the debut extended play (EP) by American singer-songwriter Christina Perri. The EP serves as the first official release by Perri, signed to Atlantic Records. The EP contains live recordings of Perri performing at the Ocean Way Studios in Los Angeles.

Background 
The Ocean Way Sessions serves as Perri's first proper release from Atlantic Records, who signed her in the wake of the unexpected success of her debut single "Jar of Hearts". All five songs on the EP were performed live at Ocean Way Studios in Los Angeles. All songs were performed with a full band, with the exception of "Jar of Hearts" receiving a solo performance.

Composition 

In an interview with CosmoGirl, Perri described the album as "Raw and bluesy and heartfelt and bold". Perri revealed that inspiration for the album was drawn by everything around her. Love takes a major part in the creation of the album, Perri adding that everything from falling in love, to losing love is the main inspiration. She described that loving love and hating it influenced the choice of the songs for the album and inspired the sound of the EP. The EP showcases Perri's vocal skills and range in emotion, as Perri alternates between breeze midtempo songs to light country sways. In songs such as "Bang Bang Bang", Perri reveals a great sense of humor to her songwriting. Since the entire EP is recorded live, Perri showcases her ability to emotionally strain her voice in performances like "Jar of Hearts", and achy, belted vocals on "Black + Blue".

Critical reception

Andrew Leahey of AllMusic described the EP as original, with smoky/pop-based sounds that are reminiscent of a saucier Sara Bareilles or a more metropolitan Brandi Carlile. Leahey added that, "With her rebel-chic tattoos and swaggering voice, Perri certainly plays the part of a pop star, and new songs like 'Black + Blue' indicate that 'Jar of Hearts' wasn’t necessarily a fluke success." iTunes reviewed the entire album, and its content positively, stating "'Bang Bang Bang' opens blending bouncy piano-pop with hints of Broadway musical pizzazz as Perri confidently croons like a slightly tougher Sara Bareilles. Her voice inflects with slightly raspier tones on the standout tune 'Black + Blue' where a lazy, twangy, slide-guitar nicely contrasts livelier drumming. The breezy 'Daydream' reveals that Perri can sing harmonies as well as anyone else on the pop charts while 'Tragedy' shows that she can also pull pretty melodies from a melancholy musing. The best is saved for last with a fleshed out version of 'Jar of Hearts.'"

Amy Sciarretto of online digital media entertainment company Artistdirect stated that the album contains haunting tracks that highlight Perri's vulnerable yet venerable, smoky voice. Joseph Ransom of BLAST gave the song a positive review, comparing tracks of the songs to the styling of indie-divas such as Fiona Apple and Laura Marling. Ransom reviewed the album's lyrics as "genuine and, at times, rather poignant", later adding that Perri contains the honesty and talent to "survive with any size of audience". RDEVITT of online subscription music service Rhapsody gave the album a positive review stating that the angsty adult-alt doesn't stop at lead single "Jar of Hearts", but instead continues throughout the album's other four-tracks showcasing Perri's depth and edge. Chad Grischow of IGN gave the song a positive review, stating that the five-song effort serves as a "warning shot" for Perri and her future with her 2011 debut. Grischow continued to compliment Perri as a "snarky earworm" who succeeds with "great melody, buoyant beat, and catchy-as-they-come hook".

Track listing 
The album's track listing was revealed on Perri's official website.

Charts

References 

2010 debut EPs
Christina Perri albums
Atlantic Records EPs
Live EPs